The Foundation Stone, or the Noble Rock is the rock at the center of the Dome of the Rock in Jerusalem. It is also known as the Pierced Stone, because it has a small hole on the southeastern corner that enters a cavern beneath the rock, known as the Well of Souls.

Traditional Jewish sources mention the stone as the place from which the creation of the world began. Classical Jewish sources also identify its location with that of the Holy of Holies.

Location
The rock is located towards the centre of the Temple Mount, a term usually applied to an artificial platform built and expanded over many centuries at the top of Jerusalem's southern hill. The current shape is the result of an expansion by Herod the Great on top of vaults over a summit called Mount Moriah which three millennia ago was the highest elevation in early Jerusalem's proximity to the City of David.

Early Muslim writings argue that the Dome of the Rock, completed in 691, is the site of the Holy of Holies and therefore the location of the Foundation Stone. The history by the 9th-century writer al-Tabari has the Jewish convert Kaʽb al-Aḥbār asking the caliph Umar to build a mosque over the rock, to which Umar responds, "O Ka`b, you are imitating the Jewish religion!" Al-Tabari then identifies the rock with the place where the Romans had "buried the temple (bayt al-maqdis) at the time of the sons of Israel." Pirqe de-Rabbi Eliezer (9th century) also wrote: "Rabbi Ishmael said: In the future, the sons of Ishmael (the Arabs) will do fifteen things in the Land of Israel … They will fence in the breaches of the walls of the Temple and construct a building on the site of the sanctuary."

Jewish sources have debated the precise location of the rock. Benjamin of Tudela writes (ca. 1170) that the site was in front of the Dome, on the site of the Western Wall.  The Travels of Petachia of Ratisbon, c.1180 and Travels of a Student of the Ramban (ca. 1400) state that "on the Temple Mount stands a beautiful sanctuary which an Arab king built long ago, over the place of the Temple sanctuary and courtyard." Obadiah Bartenura says in a 1488 letter from Jerusalem that "I sought the Foundation Stone [which marks] the former place of the Ark of the Covenant, and many told me that it is beneath a tall and beautiful dome which the Arabs built in the Temple, but the space beneath this dome is secured, such that no man may come to it, viz. to the place of the Foundation Stone, for the dome is very large." David ben Solomon ibn Abi Zimra was convinced (ca. 1570) that "under the dome [on the Temple Mount] -- there is the Foundation Stone, undoubtedly -- which the Arabs call al-Sakrah".

Other sources, operating under the belief that the Southern Wall of the Temple Mount as it stood in their time was the Southern Wall of the Biblical era, argued that the measurements given in the Talmud do not reconcile. The Holy of Holies ends up being too far north and they therefore locate the Foundation Stone as being directly opposite the current exposed section of the Western Wall, where no building currently stands. This is the view of Isaac Luria and the Maharsha, who state the prophecy that "Zion will become a ploughed field" indicates that no dwelling will be established there until the time of the Redemption. It therefore follows that the footprint of the Temple courtyard and Holy of Holies is situated in the unbuilt area between the Dome of the Rock and al-Aqsa Mosque.

Some believe the position is north of the Dome of the Rock, opposite the Gate of Mercy, which Immanuel Hai Ricchi identifies as the Shushan Gate mentioned in the Talmud. This gate was described as being opposite the opening of the sanctuary.

Modern Jewish academics list four possible locations of the Foundation Stone:
The stone that was located beneath the Ark of the Covenant is the one under the Dome of the Rock.
The stone that was located beneath the altar is now the one that is under the Dome of the Rock.
The stone that was located beneath the Ark of the Covenant is now near El Kas fountain to the South of the Dome of the Rock.
The stone that was located beneath the Ark of the Covenant is now inside the Spirits Dome situated to the north of the Dome of the Rock.

Description

Although the rock is part of the surrounding 90-million-year-old, Upper Turonian Stage, Late Cretaceous karsted limestone, the southern side forms a ledge, with a gap between it and the surrounding ground; a set of steps currently uses this gap to provide access from the Dome of the Rock to the Well of Souls beneath it.

Archaeologist Leen Ritmeyer reported that there are sections of the rock cut completely flat, which north-to-south have a width of 6 cubits, precisely the width that the Mishnah credits to the wall of the Holy of Holies, and hence Ritmeyer proposed that these flat sections constitute foundation trenches on top of which the walls of the original temple were laid. However, according to Josephus there were 31 steps up to the Holy of Holies from the lower level of the Temple Mount, and the Mishnah identifies 29 steps in total, and each step was half a cubit in height (according to the Mishnah); this is a height of at least 22 feet—the height of the Sakhra is 21 feet above the lower level of the Temple Mount, and should therefore have been under the floor.

According to Ritmeyer, a rectangular rock-cutting he discovered on the Foundation Stone marks the location where the Ark of the Covenant stood within the Holy of Holies. Ritmeier's analysis was welcomed among biblical archeologists, however scholars stated that this theory cannot be actually verified.

The rock has several artificial cuts in its surface generally attributed to the Crusaders whose frequent damage to the rock was so severe that the Christian kings of Jerusalem placed a protective marble slab over the rock. The marble slab was removed by Saladin. 

Measuring the flat surface as the position of the southern wall of a square enclosure, the west and north sides of which are formed by the low clean-cut scarp at these edges of the rock, at the position of the hypothetical centre is a rectangular cut in the rock that is about 2.5 cubits (min. 120.4 cm SI) long and 1.5 cubits (min. 72.24 cm SI) wide, which are the dimensions of the Ark of the Covenant (according to the Book of Exodus).

The Mishnah gives the height of the rock as three thumb-breadths (min. 6 cm SI) above the ground. Radbaz discusses the apparent contradiction of the Mishnah's measurements and the actual measurement of the rock within the Dome he estimates as a "height of two men" above the ground. He concluded that many changes in the natural configuration of the Temple Mount have taken place which can be attributed to excavations made by the various occupiers of Jerusalem since the Second Temple construction.

Jewish significance

The Roman-Era midrash Tanhuma sums up the centrality of and holiness of this site in Judaism:
As the navel is set in the centre of the human body,
so is the land of Israel the navel of the world...
situated in the centre of the world,
and Jerusalem in the centre of the land of Israel,
and the sanctuary in the centre of Jerusalem,
and the holy place in the centre of the sanctuary,
and the ark in the centre of the holy place,
and the Foundation Stone before the holy place,
because from it the world was founded.

According to the sages of the Talmud, it was from this rock that the world was created, itself being the first part of the Earth to come into existence. In the words of the Zohar, "The world was not created until God took a stone called Even haShetiya and threw it into the depths where it was fixed from above till below, and from it the world expanded. It is the centre point of the world and on this spot stood the Holy of Holies."

According to the Talmud, it was close to here, on the site of the altar, that God gathered the earth that was formed into Adam. It was on this rock that Adam—and later Cain and Abel and Noah—offered sacrifices to God. Jewish sources identify this rock as the place of the Binding of Isaac mentioned in the Bible, where Abraham fulfilled God's test to see if he would be willing to sacrifice his son. The mountain is identified as Moriah in Genesis 22. It is also identified as the rock upon which Jacob dreamt about angels ascending and descending on a ladder and consequently consecrating and offering a sacrifice upon.

When, according to the Bible, King David purchased a threshing floor owned by Araunah the Jebusite, it is believed that it was upon this rock that he offered the sacrifice mentioned in the verse. He wanted to construct a permanent temple there, but as his hands were "bloodied", he was forbidden to do so himself. The task was left to his son Solomon, who completed the Temple in c. 950 BCE.

The Mishnah in tractate Yoma mentions a stone situated in the Holy of Holies that was called Shetiya and had been revealed by the early prophets (i.e. David and Samuel).

An early Christian source noting Jewish attachment to the rock may be found in the Itinerarium Burdigalense, written between 333 and 334 CE when Jerusalem was under Roman rule, which describes a "perforated stone to which the Jews come every year and anoint it, bewail themselves with groans, rend their garments, and so depart."

Role in the Temple
Situated inside the Holy of Holies, this was allegedly the rock upon which the Ark of the Covenant was placed in Solomon's Temple. During the Second Temple period when the Ark of the Covenant was not present, the stone was used by the High Priest who offered up the incense and sprinkled the blood of the sacrifices on it during the Yom Kippur service.

Commemoration in Jewish law
The Jerusalem Talmud states:

Citing this, the Mishnah Berurah rules that not only are women not to prepare or attach warp threads to a weaving loom, but it is forbidden for anyone to make, buy or wear new clothes or shoes from the beginning of the week in which Tisha B'Av falls until after the fast, and that people should ideally not do so from the beginning of Av. This period is known as The Nine Days.

In further commemoration of the Foundation Stone, it is also forbidden to eat meat or drink wine from the beginning of the week in which Tisha B'av falls until after the fast. Some have the custom to refrain from these foodstuffs from Rosh Chodesh Av, while others do so from the Seventeenth of Tammuz.

Liturgical references
In the days when Selichot are recited, in the days leading up to Rosh Hashanah until Yom Kippur, the supplications include the following references:

During Sukkot, the following references to the Foundation Stone are mentioned in the Hoshanot recital:

Islamic significance
The Temple Mount, where the Foundation Stone is located, is thought by commentators of the Quran to be the place from which Muhammad began his Night Journey. Although the Quran does not specifically mention Jerusalem in name as the ascension site, labelling the site as the "farthest mosque" (from which the later-built Al-Aqsa Mosque was named), the Hadith, the recorded sayings of Muhammad, specify that the Al-Aqsa Mosque is in Jerusalem.

Beneath the Foundation Stone is a cavern known as the Well of Souls. It is sometimes thought of as the traditional hiding place of the Ark of the Covenant.

See also

 Axis mundi
 Black Stone
 Jerusalem in Islam
 Jerusalem in Judaism
 Mount Gerizim

References

External links
 

Islamic holy places
Jewish holy places
Sacred rocks
Temple Mount